Anodendron parviflorum is a species of flowering plant in the family Apocynaceae, native to tropical Asia. It was first described by William Roxburgh in 1832 as Echites parviflorus.

Distribution
Anodendron parviflorum is found in most of tropical Asia, from the Indian subcontinent through Indochina to Malesia.

Conservation
Anodendron rhinosporum was assessed as "critically endangered" in the 1998 IUCN Red List, where it is said to be native only to south-west Sri Lanka. , this species was regarded as a synonym of Anodendron parviflorum, which has a very much wider distribution throughout tropical Asia.

References

parviflorum
Flora of the Indian subcontinent
Flora of Indo-China
Flora of Malesia
Plants described in 1832